Anthony, Duke of Brabant, also known as Antoine de Brabant, Antoine de Bourgogne and Anthony of Burgundy (August 1384 – 25 October 1415), was Count of Rethel (1402–1406), Duke of Brabant, Lothier and Limburg (1406–1415), and Co-Duke of Luxemburg (1411-1415). He was killed at the battle of Agincourt.

Biography 
Anthony was the son of Philip II, Duke of Burgundy, and Margaret III, Countess of Flanders, and brother of John the Fearless. When his great-aunt Joanna died childless in 1406, Anthony inherited the Duchy of Brabant, Lothier, and Limburg, thus becoming the first Brabantian ruler of the House of Valois.

The Duke of Brabant arrived late to the Battle of Agincourt, and in his eagerness to reach the field, he dressed in improvised armour and wore a surcoat made from a trumpeter's flag. He fought valiantly but was captured by some English archers. He was executed along with the rest of the prisoners ordered by Henry V of England, the English being unaware of his high status and ransom value.

The execution was carried out as the much smaller English force found itself stretched to its limits, guarding prisoners with the battle still not won. A counterattack on the King's baggage train (guarded only by women and children) is thought to have driven King Henry to the decision, thinking he was being attacked from the rear and some chroniclers have given Brabant's belated charge as this very cause, adding to the Duke's chivalric but tragic final story (see "Agincourt", J. Barker 2005). Subsequently the executions stopped immediately when the attack was seen to falter.

Marriages and family 
He married at Arras on 21 February 1402 Jeanne of Saint-Pol (d. 1407), daughter of Waleran III of Luxembourg, Count of Ligny and Saint-Pol. They had two children:
John IV, Duke of Brabant (1403–1427)
Philip of St. Pol (1404–1430), Duke of Brabant

He married again at Brussels, on 16 July 1409, Elisabeth of Görlitz, duchess of Luxembourg (November 1390  – 8 August 1451), daughter of John, Duke of Görlitz. They had two children:
William (2 June 1410 – 10 July 1410, Brussels)
unknown (1412)
He also had two illegitimate daughters.

See also
Dukes of Burgundy family tree
Dukes of Brabant family tree

References

1384 births
1415 deaths
Anthony
Anthony
Anthony
Military personnel killed in action
15th-century peers of France